Carathis byblis is a moth of the family Erebidae first described by William Schaus in 1892. It is found in Brazil, Costa Rica and Guatemala.

References

Phaegopterina
Moths described in 1892